West End Wheelmen's Club, also known as the Franklin Club and Knights of Columbus, is a historic clubhouse located at Wilkes-Barre, Luzerne County, Pennsylvania.  It was built in 1897, and is a three-story, rectangular frame Shingle Style building.  It features a wraparound porch and porte cochere.  The rear of the building was rebuilt after a fire in 1913.

It was added to the National Register of Historic Places in 1997.

Gallery

References

External links

Buildings and structures in Wilkes-Barre, Pennsylvania
Clubhouses on the National Register of Historic Places in Pennsylvania
Cultural infrastructure completed in 1897
Shingle Style architecture in Pennsylvania
Victorian architecture in Pennsylvania
National Register of Historic Places in Luzerne County, Pennsylvania